Teddington is a locality in the Fraser Coast Region, Queensland, Australia.

History 
Prior to 2008, this locality was split between the local government areas of Shire of Tiaro and Shire of Woocoo. However, in 2008, both of these shires were absorbed into the new Fraser Coast Region, reuniting the locality.

References 

Fraser Coast Region
Localities in Queensland